PF-4455242 is a selective, short-acting (non-"inactivating") antagonist of the κ-opioid receptor. Discovered by Pfizer in 2009, it was pursued in a phase I clinical trial for the treatment of bipolar disorder, and was also investigated as a treatment for depression and substance abuse. However, development was stopped in September 2010 due to toxicology findings in animals that had been exposed to the drug for three months.

See also
 κ-Opioid receptor § Antagonists
 List of investigational antidepressants

References

External links
 PF-4455242 - AdisInsight

Amines
Kappa-opioid receptor antagonists
Pyrrolidines
Sulfonamides
Pfizer brands